Sultan Hasanuddin International Airport  is an international airport in Makassar, South Sulawesi. Angkasa Pura I. The current terminal was opened on 20 August 2008. The airport is the main gateway for flights to the eastern part of Indonesia, and named after Sultan Hasanuddin (1631–1670), a Sultan of Gowa, who fought against the Dutch East India Company in the 1660s.

Location
Sultan Hasanuddin International Airport is located on the border of Makassar and Maros, a suburb in South Sulawesi, approximately 15 minutes  from Makassar city via freeway/tollway or 20 minutes  via highway.

History

Hasanuddin Airport, originally named Kadieng Flying Field, was built in 1935 by the government of the Netherlands Indies, approximately 22 kilometers to the north of Makassar. An airfield runway with grass-sized 1600m x 45m (Runway 08-26) was inaugurated on 27 September 1937 by a commercial flight from Singapore, a Douglas Aircraft D2/F6 operated by KNILM (Koninklijke Nederlands Indische Luchtvaart Maatschappij). In 1942, the government of Japan expanded the field using POW labor and renamed it Field Mandai. In 1945, the Dutch built a new runway.

In 1950, Indonesia's Department of Public Works, Section Flying Field, took over the field, and in 1955 it was transferred to Civil Aviation, now the Directorate General Air Transportation, which extended the runway to 2345m x 45m and renamed the airport Air Mandai. In 1980, the 13–31 runway was built—2500m x 45m; in the same year the name changed to Air Port Hasanuddin. In 1985 the Port of Hasanuddin Air changed its name to Hasanuddin Airport.

On 3 March 1987, management of the airport was transferred from the Directorate General of Air Transport to Perum Angkasa Pura I, based on Government Regulation No. 1 / 1987 of 9 January 1987. On 1 January 1993 the company name changed to PT (Persero) Angkasa Pura I. On 30 October 1994, Hasanuddin Airport, now International Airport in accordance with the decision of the Minister of Transportation, KM number 61/1994 dated 7 January 1995, was inaugurated by the Governor Level I Regional Head of South Sulawesi Province. 28 March 1995 marked the flight by Malaysia Airlines directly from Kuala Lumpur to Hasanuddin, followed by a SilkAir flight from Singapore Changi Airport. Since 1990, Hasanuddin Airport has been used as an embarkation / disembarkation point for Hajj pilgrimages to Jeddah.

Hasanuddin Airport serves the Eastern Indonesia Area and South Sulawesi Province. On 20 August 2008 the new terminal opened, replacing the old terminal which was subsequently transferred to the Indonesian Air Force.

On 8 January 2010, the airport inaugurated its newly built 3100 m runway (03/21) for commercial flights. With the opening of the 2nd runway, Hasanuddin became the second commercial airport in Indonesia that has two runways, the other being Soekarno–Hatta International Airport in Jakarta. It is also one out of only two airports in Indonesia to include cross runways, with Budiarto Airport near Serpong which serves as flying school.

The airport now handles three wide-body aircraft per day - one 747-400 to Medan and Jeddah and two Airbus A330-200s to Jakarta. The local government plans to extend the runway from 3100m to 3500m to accommodate larger aircraft such as the Airbus A380, and is pending local clearance.

Terminals

The old terminal was completely vacated after the opening of the new terminal in 2008 and is currently used by the TNI-AU (Indonesian Air Force) which houses Skadron Udara 11 (Air Squadron 11).

The new terminal is located just south of the old terminal. It has the capacity to handle 7 million passengers and in 2010 served 5 million, It is five times larger than the old terminal, and includes six jetbridges. It is the first airport terminal in Indonesia designed in a high-tech architecture style.

The expansion of the terminal is currently under construction and expected to be finished in mid 2021. The terminal will be 3 times bigger and can accommodate around 15 millions passengers. Couple more aerobridges will be added for both Domestic and International Flight.

There will be dedicated international terminal and an elevated departure drop off, a parking building. The grand design of the terminal is based on butterfly.

Traffic figures
Since the beginning of the new millennium, passenger numbers have increased more than sixfold. Historically air freight traffic has played a minor role in Makassar from an economic standpoint. It has developed slowly in part due to the relatively high license fee by the operator, currently 25 rupiah per kg of body construction and 15 rupiah per kg for the goods introduction.

Airlines and destinations

Passenger

Cargo

Ground transportation

Bus
Shuttle airport buses operated by Perum DAMRI serve several destinations from Sultan Hasanuddin Airport.

Car and taxi
Taxi and shuttle services are available through several companies.

Use by Indonesian Air Force

The airport also houses the Skadron Udara 5, 11 and 33 (5th, 11th and 33rd Air Squadrons). The 11th Squadron is equipped with Su-27SK, Su-30MK/Su-30MK2. The 5th Air Squadron is equipped with Boeing 737 and CN-235-MPA while 33rd Squadron operates C-130 Hercules.

Accidents and incidents
 On September 25, 2014, a Sriwijaya Air Boeing 737 made a hard landing and 4 tyres blew up. No casualties occurred.
 On June 2, 2015 a Garuda Indonesia Boeing 737-800 overran the runway on landing at Makassar Airport. No casualties occurred.
 On February 17, 2021, a Garuda Indonesia Boeing 737-800, registered as PK-GFF, had to return to the airport after take-off as flight GA-642 to Gorontalo, after reporting an engine failure; the plane's right or number 2 engine, had black smoke coming out of it. The plane landed safely and no injuries were reported, but the airplane sustained damage on the aforementioned engine.

Picture gallery

References

External links

 Sultan Hasanuddin International Airport @ Directorate General of Civil Aviation

Airports in South Sulawesi
Airports established in 1935
Indonesian Air Force bases